Derek Anthony Brownbill (born 4 February 1954) is an English former footballer who played as a forward. He played in the Football League for Liverpool, Port Vale, and Wigan Athletic before spells with American side Cleveland Cobras and English non-league clubs Stafford Rangers, Oswestry Town, Morecambe, Witton Albion, and Warrington Town.

Playing career
Brownbill came through the youth ranks at Liverpool to turn professional at the age of 18; he featured in the 1972 FA Youth Cup final defeat to Aston Villa. He made his only appearance for the senior team on 15 September 1973, in a 1–1 draw with Birmingham City at St Andrew's. He joined Port Vale for £5,000 in February 1975. Liverpool manager Bob Paisley rejected a bid of £20,000 from Bury because he had already made a verbal agreement with Vale coach Reg Berks. Brownbill scored his first senior goal in a 1–0 home win over Charlton Athletic on 3 March, and finished the 1974–75 season with four goals in 16 Third Division appearances. He hit nine goals in 41 games in 1975–76, including four goals in the First Round of the FA Cup to save the "Valiants" from defeat to Southern League side Grantham (they drew the original tie 2–2 before winning the replay). He lost his first team place in August 1976, and scored three goals in 23 games in 1976–77. Manager Roy Sproson was sacked in October 1977, however Brownbill failed to re-establish himself in the first eleven under new boss Bobby Smith; he went on to score three goals in 28 appearances in 1977–78. During his time at Vale Park the crowd used to barrack him for being big and clumsy, when in fact it was part of Roy Sproson's plan for Brownbill to shield the ball and allow attacking midfielders Brian Horton and Terry Bailey to get forward and score goals (Horton and Bailey got 27 goals between them in 1974–75 with Brownbill's support).

Handed a free transfer in May 1978, he emigrated to the US with the Cleveland Cobras of the American Soccer League, only to return to the UK with Wigan Athletic in September. He had 20 starts and 17 substitute appearances in 1978–79, scoring six goals for Ian McNeill's "Latics". Wigan finished the 1979–80 season in sixth place in the Fourth Division. He later moved on to various non-league clubs: Stafford Rangers, Oswestry Town, Morecambe and Witton Albion, before becoming the player-manager of Warrington Town.

Managerial career
After leaving his post at Warrington Town he became the manager of Curzon Ashton. He was the Director of Football at Warrington Town until 2009.

Career statistics

Honours
Liverpool
FA Youth Cup runner-up: 1972

References

1954 births
Living people
Footballers from Liverpool
English footballers
Association football forwards
Liverpool F.C. players
Port Vale F.C. players
English expatriate footballers
English expatriate sportspeople in the United States
Expatriate soccer players in the United States
Cleveland Cobras players
Wigan Athletic F.C. players
Stafford Rangers F.C. players
Oswestry Town F.C. players
Morecambe F.C. players
Witton Albion F.C. players
Warrington Town F.C. players
English Football League players
American Soccer League (1933–1983) players
Association football player-managers
English football managers
Warrington Town F.C. managers